Angie Xtravaganza (October 17, 1964 – March 31, 1993)  was a co-founder and Mother of the House of Xtravaganza. A prominent transgender performer in New York City's gay ball culture, Xtravanganza featured in the acclaimed 1990 documentary film Paris is Burning.

Early life 
Xtravaganza was born in New York City, one of 13 children born to a Catholic Puerto Rican family in South Bronx. From the age of 13 she nurtured a family of "children" on the Christopher Street piers and Times Square, primarily made up of those who had been rejected by their own families; they referred to her as "Ma". Xtravaganza started doing drag in 1980 and began competing in balls at the age of 16. It was on the Christopher Street piers where she first met Hector Xtravaganza, with whom she would later found their eponymous house.

House of Xtravaganza 
In 1982, the House of Xtravaganza was founded, with Xtravaganza taking on the role of House Mother. The House was notable for being the first primarily Latino house within the ball scene, and was made partially in response to discrimination against Latino performers in the scene at that time. The House of Xtravaganza heavily influenced the New York City gay ball culture, with Xtravanganza becoming known as one of the "terrible five", the five reigning house mothers of the ball world, alongside Dorian Corey, Pepper LaBeija, Avis Pendavis, and Paris Dupree. As a result of her profile, Xtravangaza featured in the 1988 article "The Slap of Love" by Pulitzer Prize-winning author Michael Cunningham, as well as the 1990 documentary film Paris is Burning, directed by Jennie Livingston. Xtravaganza's notable drag children included Danni and Venus Xtravaganza, whose life and murder was featured in Paris is Burning.

Death and legacy 
Xtravaganza was diagnosed with AIDS in 1991 and subsequently developed Kaposi's sarcoma, for which she received chemotherapy. Xtravaganza died in New York City in 1993 at the age of 28 from AIDS-related liver disease, although it has also been speculated that her liver problems stemmed from her long-term use of black market hormones. Xtravaganza was cremated and her ashes returned to her family, who buried them under her deadname. Three weeks later, The New York Times published an article about the ball scene, featuring a photograph of Xtravaganza with the headline "Paris Has Burned", recounting the untimely deaths of many of its central personalities, including Xtravaganza. In 1994, Junior Vasquez released a single entitled "X" which was dedicated to Xtravaganza. The House of Xtravanganza remains an active part of the New York City cultural scene.

References

External links

1964 births
1993 deaths
AIDS-related deaths in New York (state)
Deaths from liver disease
Puerto Rican LGBT entertainers
Transgender entertainers
Transgender women
House of Xtravaganza
LGBT people from New York (state)
20th-century LGBT people